Ultra Zoom is a series of digital cameras by Olympus. It may refer to:

 Olympus C-2100 Ultra Zoom (2000)
 Olympus C-700UZ (2001)
 Olympus C-720 Ultra Zoom (2002)
 Olympus C-730UZ (2002)
 Olympus C-740UZ (2003)
 Olympus C-770 Ultra Zoom (2004)
 Olympus SP-500 Ultra Zoom (2005)
 Olympus SP-510 Ultra Zoom (2006)